Jonathan David Bellion (born December 26, 1990) is an American singer, rapper, producer, and songwriter. He was born and raised in Lake Grove, New York on Long Island. He is best known for his song "All Time Low," along with his writing and producing credits. Bellion has released four mixtapes and two studio albums. His first, The Human Condition, was released on June 10, 2016, and it debuted at number five on the US Billboard 200. He released his second studio album, Glory Sound Prep, on November 9, 2018.

He is currently signed to Visionary Music Group and Capitol Records. Bellion also opened the concerts from the third leg of Twenty One Pilots' Emotional Roadshow World Tour, which also featured guest artists Judah and the Lion.

Early life
Bellion was born and raised in Lake Grove, New York. He is of Italian descent, and his family comes from Naples. Torn between his love for basketball and music throughout high school, Bellion made the choice to pursue his music career in his junior year. After high school, he enrolled in the music program at the private Five Towns College in Dix Hills, New York. At the age of 19, he decided to drop out of college and focus on writing professionally. He worked under songwriter and Warner Brothers A&R executive Kara DioGuardi for a year and signed a deal through her personal publishing company. Through this experience, Bellion learned how to write songs for different artists, in genres such as rock and hip hop.

Career

2011–2014: Early career and various mixtapes
Bellion's first mixtape, Scattered Thoughts Vol. 1 was released in early 2011 via his Facebook page and reached over 11,000 downloads. Bellion signed with Visionary Music Group in 2012 and released a cover of Drake's "The Motto" on VMG's YouTube page.

In 2012, Bellion wrote the chorus to the song "The Monster" by Eminem featuring Rihanna. This song won a Grammy Award in the 2015 Grammy Awards for Best Rap/Sung Collaboration. Bellion also co-wrote and produced the song "Trumpets" by Jason Derulo in 2012, which was not released until 2013 in the UK and 2014 in the US.

Bellion released his second free project, titled Translations Through Speakers on February 20, 2013, his third, The Separation on December 10 of the same year and his fourth free project, The Definition on September 23, 2014, with the single "Luxury" Bellion also headlined his first national tour called The Beautiful Mind Tour in October 2014.

2015–2017: Touring and The Human Condition

Bellion released several singles in early 2015, including "Woodstock (Psychedelic Fiction)", "All Time Low", and "Woke the F*ck Up" through Capitol Records. On March 31, 2015, Bellion announced his second national tour, The Definition Tour. The tour began on May 26 and concluded on July 2. Bellion was also featured on "Beautiful Now", a song on Zedd's album True Colors, which was released on May 15, 2015. Bellion was also featured on American rapper B.o.B's album Psycadelik Thoughtz on the song "Violence".

Bellion released several acoustic versions of his songs, including one of "All Time Low" on February 26, 2016, and one of "Human" on March 4, 2016.

Bellion confirmed that his debut album The Human Condition was set to be released on June 10, 2016. He released three promotional singles from the album: "Guillotine", on April 13, 2016, "80's Films", on May 27, 2016, and "Maybe IDK" on June 2, 2016. The lead single from the album, "All Time Low" was released on May 13, 2016 and became his most successful single to date, reaching number 16 on the US Billboard Hot 100 and was certified Double-platinum in the US and Australia. On June 10, The Human Condition was officially released. Bellion states that the album is simply about being human, explaining, "Us as humans all have the same problems. We struggle with pride and tons of different issues that nobody really wants to talk about. So I figured if I'm the honest one showing how human I am, it will make people feel better about themselves." In his music, Jon talks a lot about God. He doesn't just talk about a vague idea of faith; he makes sure to emphasize God specifically. Bellion also says the sonics and album artwork for The Human Condition were created in order to get the attention of Disney/Pixar, saying, "It's like a giant business plan for Disney Pixar because it's always been my dream to score a movie for them. So basically if my debut album blows up, John Lasseter [of Disney Pixar] and these guys will hopefully see these images and be like 'Wait a second this is not one of our movies, what is this?'" The artwork for the album was created by visual development artist David Ardinaryas Lojaya. During The Human Condition tour, Bellion announced that a representative from Pixar met him at one of his shows. He was invited to the Pixar Campus and said he might be involved with a Pixar film in the near future.

In June 2017, Bellion was picked as Elvis Duran's Artist of the Month and was featured on NBC's Today show hosted by Kathie Lee Gifford and Hoda Kotb and broadcast nationally where he performed "All Time Low" live. Bellion was the opening act for the US leg of rock duo Twenty One Pilots' 2017 Emotional Roadshow World Tour. The 33-show tour began on January 17 in Providence, Rhode Island and ended on March 5 in Louisville, Kentucky.

On October 13, 2017, Bellion released his mixtapes Translations Through Speakers, The Separation and The Definition on digital stores as well as releasing a collection containing the three mixtapes entitled Growth.

2018: Glory Sound Prep

On January 25, Bellion teased a snippet of an upcoming song on an Instagram video. On April 16, Bellion began teasing his next album with 4 pictures captioned with "GSP". He later changed the name of his Instagram to his band/group "Beautiful Mind". On June 23, Bellion released a behind the scenes video of his previous album's last track, "Hand of God (Outro)".

On October 9, Bellion posted a photo to his Twitter account from "GSP Staff", stating: "Tomorrow, Headmaster Stormzy requests your presence for an orientation ceremony in the main atrium. Time: 3:00 pm EST." The following day he announced the studio album Glory Sound Prep on his Twitter account, which was set to be released on November 9. On October 17, he released a preview on his social media accounts of the first single from the album, "Conversations with My Wife", which was released on October 19. The following week, he released a preview on his social media accounts of the second single, "JT", and released it on October 26.  "Stupid Deep", the third single off of the album, was released on November 2.

On November 9, Bellion released Glory Sound Prep.

2019—present: Touring and hiatus
Bellion was cast for a voice role in the film Dragon Ball Super: Broly as Male Frieza soldier but had to step down to a lesser role due to scheduling conflict . Bellion is featured in a song with American DJ Illenium, titled "Good Things Fall Apart", which released on May 13, 2019. He also released a single titled "Crop Circles" on May 30, 2019. Bellion embarked on The Glory Sound Prep Tour which began on June 12 and concluded on November 12 of the same year. He  helped produce and write singles such as "Stacy" and "Life Must Go On" by Quinn XCII, as well as "Liar" and "Shameless" by Camila Cabello, "Graveyard" by Halsey, and "Memories" by Maroon 5, "Holy" by Justin Bieber, featuring Chance the Rapper. Bellion co-wrote multiple songs on Justin Bieber's Justice album, including the hit song "Ghost", which Bellion says he wrote about his late grandmother. The song reached #1 on the US Pop Radio. He also co-wrote and co-produced "Vulnerable" from Selena Gomez's 2020 album Rare and co-wrote "Daisies" by Katy Perry.

On June 8, 2021, Bellion took to Twitter where he tweeted "New music" before quickly deleting the tweet. He then changed his social media into a "blacked-out" state a couple weeks later. Jon was featured on Lawrence's song "False Alarms" released July 22, 2021. Bellion released his first single in over 2 years, "I Feel It" (with Burna Boy) on September 17, 2021.

On February 19, 2023, Bellion released an unfinished song called "Fallen" to his social media. The song features Jon Batiste.

Beautiful Mind Records 
In July 2019, Bellion launched his own record label called Beautiful Mind Records and signed the pop/soul band, Lawrence. Lawrence was the opener for most of his shows on the Glory Sound Prep Tour. He helped write and produce three singles off of their 2021 debut album Hotel TV: "Casualty", "It's Not All About You", and "The Weather".

Bellion has stated that his intention with this new label is to "take care of artists for the rest of their careers" and to create a family of musical creators who he supports and with whom he collaborates.

Influences
Bellion has stated on multiple occasions that Kanye West is one of his biggest inspirations. "I loved everything but it was Kanye West who really changed everything for me." Bellion has also stated that he was inspired by Eminem, Pharrell Williams, Coldplay, John Mayer, André 3000, and Paul Simon. Bellion has also made it known that he is a big fan of J Dilla and animated film studio Pixar, drawing inspiration from the musician and computer animation film studio for both The Definition and The Human Condition. Bellion explains that he loves how Pixar movies are "simple yet presented in a way that is groundbreaking". Bellion credits much of his musical development and success to his bandmates whom he met while in college, expressing his love for them in his "Beautiful Mind Documentary" stating, "everybody in my band has taught me something, and has gotten me to where I am because of them" continuing "I surround myself with people better than me at something, you will very rarely see somebody around me, especially musically, who I don't look up to".

Personal life 
Bellion announced that he was married during the early months of 2018. His song "Conversations with My Wife" from his 2018 album Glory Sound Prep alluded to his marriage and its attributes, leading his fanbase to question the relationship status that Bellion seldom discussed publicly.

Bellion identifies as a Christian.

Discography

Studio albums

The Human Condition (2016)
 Glory Sound Prep (2018)

References

External links
 
 

1990 births
American male singers
Living people
Singers from New York (state)
People from Suffolk County, New York
American people of Italian descent
American male rappers
American Christians
American hip hop singers
Capitol Records artists
21st-century American rappers
21st-century American male musicians
Alternative hip hop musicians
American indie pop musicians
Dance-pop musicians
Alternative rock singers
American alternative rock musicians
American contemporary R&B singers